

See also 
 United States House of Representatives elections, 1802 and 1803
 List of United States representatives from Ohio

Notes

References 

1803
Ohio
United States House of Representatives